Tele5 is a Polish free-to-air television channel owned by Polcast Television. It was launched on 19 April 2002, replacing Super 1. Originally it broadcast only European shows (i.e., its own productions, those of the BBC), but later also started showing Canadian series.

History
Tele 5 made its debut on the market on 19 April 2002, replacing . The channel broadcast entertainment programmes, a significant part of which were films and series. In addition, the station broadcast documentaries, often devoted to controversial topics, as well as programmes for lovers of extreme sports. In addition to the production of European and American cinema, the station presented its own journalistic, cultural, entertainment and culinary programmes. In October 2009, Tele 5 launched a free live broadcast of its programme on the internet. From September to November 2012, the car races of the German DTM series and the Italian Superstars series were broadcast. In 5 November 2012, Tele 5 launched its own high-definition feed. On 30 June 2016, the station was placed in the multiplex of local TVT, and on 17 July 2016 it also appeared in the multiplex of TVL.

Programs on Tele5 
Own production

 Werdykt
 Kapka Karaska
 Lub czasopisma
 Plusy dodatnie i plusy ujemne
 Buon Appetito!
 contener.pl
 Rybia Nocka
 Prognoza pogody
 Dzień z gwiazdą
 Moje dziecko
 The Club
 Bilet na podroz
 Gosc Tele 5
 Twarzą w Twarz
 10 minut
 Inforama
 DJ Tour
 Reactor
 Ryzyko
 Akademia Gotowania
 Telegotowka

Sports magazines
 Czarny Sport
 Akademia Fitness i Kulturystyki

References

External links
Official Site
Media5

Television channels in Poland
Television channels and stations established in 2002